Filip Šváb (born 28 April 1983) is a Czech canoeist. He competed in the men's K-1 200 metres event at the 2016 Summer Olympics.

References

1983 births
Living people
Czech male canoeists
Olympic canoeists of the Czech Republic
Canoeists at the 2016 Summer Olympics
Sportspeople from Olomouc
Canoeists at the 2015 European Games
European Games competitors for the Czech Republic